The Audi TT is a series of 2-door production sports cars and convertibles, made by Audi since 1998, in its third generation since 2014. The first two generations were assembled by Audi's Hungarian subsidiary, one of the world's biggest engine making plants, using bodyshells manufactured and painted at Audi's Ingolstadt plant and parts made entirely by the Hungarian factory for the third generation.

For each of its three generations, the TT has been available as a 2+2 coupé and as a two-seater roadster based on consecutive generations of Volkswagen's "Group A" platforms, starting with its 'PQ34' fourth generation. Born from this platform, the Audi TT shares powertrain and suspension layouts with its siblings, including the Audi A3, like a transversely mounted front-engine, powering front-wheel drive or four-wheel drive, and fully independent suspension using MacPherson struts in front.

Origins
The styling of the Audi TT began in the spring of 1994 at the Volkswagen Group Design Center in California.  The TT was first shown as a concept car at the 1995 Frankfurt Motor Show.  The design is credited to J Mays and Freeman Thomas, with Hartmut Warkuss, Peter Schreyer, Martin Smith and Romulus Rost contributing to the interior design.

 Audi did not initially offer any type of automatic transmission option for the TT. However, from 2003, a dual clutch six-speed Direct-Shift Gearbox (DSG) became available, with the United Kingdom TT variants becoming the world's first user of a dual clutch transmission configured for a right-hand drive vehicle, although the outright world first for a road car equipped with a dual clutch transmission was claimed earlier by a Volkswagen Group platform-mate, the left hand drive Volkswagen Golf Mk4 R32.

Name
The Audi TT takes its name from the successful motor racing tradition of NSU in the British Isle of Man TT (Tourist Trophy) motorcycle race.  NSU marque began competing at the Isle of Man TT in 1907 with the UK manager Martin Geiger finishing in fifth position in the single-cylinder race.  The 1938 Isle of Man Lightweight TT race was won by Ewald Kluge with a 250 cc supercharged DKW motor-cycle and the DKW and NSU companies later merged into the company now known as Audi. The Audi TT also follows the NSU 1000TT, 1200TT and TTS cars of the 1960s in taking their names from the race. The TT name has also been attributed to the phrase "Technology & Tradition".

TT Mk1 (Type 8N, 1998–2006)

The production model (internal designation Type 8N) was launched as a coupé in September 1998, followed by a roadster in August 1999. It is based on the Volkswagen Group A4 (PQ34) platform as used for the Volkswagen Golf Mk4, the original Audi A3, the Škoda Octavia, and others. The styling differed little from the concept, except for slightly reprofiled bumpers, and the addition of rear quarterlight windows behind the doors. Factory production commenced in October 1998.

Early TT models received press coverage following a series of high-speed accidents and the related fatalities which occurred at speeds in excess of  during abrupt lane changes or sharp turns.  Both the coupé and roadster variants were recalled in late 1999/early 2000, to improve predictability of the car's handling at very high speeds. Audi's Electronic Stability Programme (ESP) or Anti Slip Regulation (ASR) and rear spoiler were added, along with modifications to the suspension system. All changes were incorporated into subsequent production.

The Audi TT was nominated for the North American Car of the Year award for 2000.  It was also on Car and Driver magazine's Ten Best list for 2000 and 2001. By 2003, Audi had provided a "face-lift" to the TT, with a number of small styling and practicality improvements.

Production of the Audi TT (Type 8N) ended in June 2006.

Powertrain

Mechanically, the TT shares an identical powertrain layout with its related Volkswagen Group-mates. The TT uses a transversely mounted internal combustion engine, with either front-wheel drive or 'quattro four-wheel drive' available as an option. Haldex Traction enabled four-wheel drive, branded "Quattro", was optional on the 180 engine and standard on the more powerful 225 version.

In July 2003, a new six-speed dual clutch transmission – dubbed the Direct-Shift Gearbox (DSG), which improves acceleration through much-reduced shift times, was offered, along with a stiffer suspension.

Aerodynamics

The curved outline and rounded bodywork of the Mk1 TT’s design was inspired by Bauhaus, as stated by Head of Audi Design Marc Lichte.  This simplified curved shape was unique at the time and resulted in a drag coefficient of 0.35.  which was similar to its competitors such as the BMW Z4 and the Mazda MX5.

However, the TT was involved in a number of high-speed accidents which were attributed to aerodynamic instability at high speeds. To solve these issues, Audi added modified control arms and firmer shock absorbers on both the front and rear suspension as well as a rear spoiler. 

One CFD study, showed that this new spoiler led to a 0.04 decrease in drag coefficient and a 0.108 reduction in rear lift coefficient.  Without the spoiler, air flows over the top of the car and accelerates as it curves round the rear bumper. This acceleration lowers pressure, due to the Bernoulli principle, and generates lift on the car. Furthermore, the point of flow separation at the rear bumper varies, causing a variation in the forces acting on the car which likely contributed to the car’s instability issues at high speed. 

A rear spoiler disrupts this flow and creates a pocket of recirculating air in front of the spoiler. This results in an increase in static pressure and a reduction in lift. The spoiler also solves the separation point which leads to reduced flow oscillations. 

This approximate 65% reduction in lift was also seen in a correlation study where the original and revised Audi TT, along with several competitors were tested at 125mph.

TT quattro Sport
In 2005, Audi released the Coupé-only limited edition to 1,165 pieces. 800 with steering wheel on the right side/ 365 with steering wheel on the left side.

This weight reduction was achieved by removing the spare wheel, rear harmonic damper, rear parcel shelf and rear seats, and the standard fitment air conditioning. The main battery was also relocated to the rear of the vehicle in order to maintain weight distribution as much as possible. Lightweight fixed-back Recaro bucket seats graced the interior. Distinguishable from other TT Coupés by its two-tone paint scheme (Phantom Black pearl painted roof, pillars and mirror housings, in combination with either Avus Silver, Phantom Black, Mauritius Blue or Misano Red body colour) and unique 18" 15-spoke cast aluminium alloy wheels, plus the same body kit as fitted to the TT 3.2 V6, the TT quattro Sport also featured black exhaust tailpipes and uprated suspension settings and new wheels,  wider at the rear for improved handling. The brochure stated V6-spec brakes were to be fitted, however models delivered in the UK came with the standard 225 spec brake callipers which were red-painted.

8N engines
The 8N powertrain options consist of the following engines and drivelines:

Lawsuits
There were two United States class action lawsuits affecting specific model years of the first generation TT.

On 22 June 2007, Pearson, Simon, Soter, Warshaw & Penny, LLP and the Law Office of Robert L. Starr filed a class action lawsuit against Volkswagen Group of America, alleging that the timing belts for model year 1999–2003 Audi and Volkswagen vehicles equipped with a 1.8-litre turbocharged engine fail prematurely. The vehicles included are the Audi TT, Audi A4 and Volkswagen Passat. The complaint alleged that the timing belts failed prior to the service interval, as stated in the owner's manual. The parties have reached a class-wide settlement, and preliminary approval of the settlement was granted by the court on 19 May 2008.

On 22 May 2008, the U.S. District Court, Northern District of California, entered an order preliminarily approving a nationwide settlement of a class action lawsuit brought by Green Welling LLP, on behalf of all current and prior owners and lessees of 2000–2004, and 2005 model year Audi TTs. The lawsuit and settlement related to allegedly defective instrument clusters, and Audi TT owners are entitled to submit claims for repairs, replacement and/or cash reimbursement for out-of-pocket expenses, and all TT owners covered by the suit will receive a two-year extension of their existing four-year warranty (limited to the instrument cluster).

2.7T Quattro gmbH Concept 
This was accomplished by using a B5 RS4 donor car, which included engine, transmission, rear differential, axles, brakes, and wheels from a B5 Avant. Using the RS4 drivetrain, Audi had the ability to utilize a Torsen based 6-speed Quattro manual transmission in a car that is normally using a transverse engine layout and Haldex based all wheel drive system.

TT Mk2 (Type 8J, 2006–2014)

In August 2004, Audi announced that the next generation TT would be manufactured using aluminium, and would go into production in 2007. A preview of the second-generation TT was provided in the form of the Audi Shooting Brake concept car, shown at the Tokyo Motor Show in 2005. This concept was an insight into the new TT, but featured angular styling, and a "shooting-brake" two-door hatchback body style.

Audi debuted the second-generation TT, internal designation Type 8J, on 6 April 2006, using the Volkswagen Group A5 (PQ35) platform with aluminium front bodypanels, and steel in the rear, to enhance its near-neutral front-to-rear weight distribution. Available in front-wheel drive or "quattro" four-wheel drive layout, the TT is again offered as a 2+2 Coupé, and as a two-seater Roadster. The second generation is five inches longer and three inches wider than its predecessor.  Factory production commenced during August 2006.

8J powertrain
The powertrain options initially only included petrol engines, which consist of either one of two inline four-cylinder engines – the all-new 1.8-litre EA888 Turbocharged Fuel Stratified Injection (TFSI) (available initially only in Germany, later elsewhere from mid 2009), or the more common and established EA113-variant 2.0-litre TFSI. The Fuel Stratified Injection (FSI) technology was derived from the Audi Le Mans endurance race cars, and offers improved fuel efficiency as well as an increased power output and cleaner emissions. The 3.2-litre 'V6' badged VR6 engine is carried over from the previous generation, and this engine was also available in the Canadian model.  2.0 TFSI quattro models, with the latest EA888 engine, became available in 2009 model year.

A six-speed manual transmission is standard, with the six-speed Direct-Shift Gearbox (now called "S-TRONIC" on all Audi models) as an option for all engines. Quattro on-demand four-wheel drive, again using the Haldex Traction clutch is available – standard on V6 models, but not available on the 1.8 TFSI.

8J suspension and other features
Like all its PQ35 platform-mates, the new 8J TT now has a multi-link fully independent rear suspension to complement the front independent suspension.  The entire suspension system can be enhanced with Audi's new active suspension, "Audi Magnetic Ride", available as an option.  This is based on BWI Group's MagneRide, which uses magneto rheological dampers (this means that an electronic control unit for the suspension will automatically adjust its damping properties depending on the current road conditions and driving manner).

The new TT also features a revised rear spoiler which preserves the clean aesthetics of the TT when not raised. The spoiler can also be manually controlled by the driver via a switch on the lower centre console. Manual operation by the switch reverts to automatic operation (i.e.: manual mode is cancelled) if the vehicle speed rises above the stated limit.

2.0 TDI quattro
As its name indicates, it is only available with four-wheel-drive, and is also available in Coupé and Roadster versions. It includes a six-speed manual transmission.

The Roadster TDI achieves an average  and CO2 of 144 gram/km.

TT S-Line
As an additional package a standard Audi TT can be bought from factory with a special body kit upgrade to make it look like the Audi TT-RS version. The upgrade includes a fixed rear spoiler, and Alcantara/leather sports seats (Silk Nappa, Fine Nappa leather optional).

TTS

At the 2008 North American International Auto Show (NAIAS) in Detroit, Audi released the first Audi "S" model of the TT range – the Audi TTS quattro, with a heavily revised 2.0 TFSI engine. The cylinder block, cylinder head and the fuel injectors have all been modified from the base 2.0 TFSI engine (ID: CDL).

It was available with a choice of either a six-speed close-ratio manual transmission, or a six-speed 'S tronic' transmission. In the United States, the S tronic gearbox was the only available transmission. Like all Audi "S" models, it was only available with four-wheel drive as standard.

Radially ventilated front disc brakes are clamped by a single-piston gloss black caliper emblazoned with a bold TTS logo, and a lap timer is prominent in the centre of the instrument cluster.  9Jx18" '5-parallel-spoke' design alloy wheels are standard, with 245/40 ZR18 high-performance tyres.  19" '5-spoke star' wheels and tyres are optional. The exterior has some changes over the standard model – with a TTS body styling: with redesigned front, with larger air intakes, redesigned rear bumper, side sill extensions, and four exhaust tailpipes.

Official performance figures include a  acceleration time of 5.2 seconds, with the Roadster four-tenths slower at 5.6 seconds.

Audi UK offered eight TTS cars for official use by the race organisers at the 2008 Isle of Man TT motorcycle races.

The car went on sale in the US at November 2008.

In 2014, at the International Motor Show in Geneva, Audi unveiled the new TTS model for the 2016 model year, alongside the standard 2016 Audi TT model. Both models were planned to go on sale in the beginning of 2015.

TT Clubsport quattro concept
Audi displayed a new show car variant of the second generation Audi TT – the Audi TT Clubsport quattro, at the 2008 Wörthersee Tour at Pörtschach am Wörthersee in Austria. Shown only in an open-topped "speedster" variant, its 2.0 TFSI engine has been tuned to give . The soft-top on the standard TT Roadster has been deleted, and replaced with two "humps", along with two substantial roll bars. LED daytime running lamps, an aggressive body kit with large frontal air intakes, black-painted "single frame grille" and a lower spoiler lip complete the new look from the front. At the rear, twin polished stainless steel oval tail pipes exit aside a new rear diffuser.

Whilst the TT Clubsport quattro is primarily a "show car", Audi has not ruled out the possibility of small-scale production.

TT RS

The TT RS featured an all-new 2.5-litre Inline-5 turbocharged petrol engine.

Ever since the original Audi "RS" model – the Audi RS2 Avant – all Audi "RS" models were assembled at the quattro GmbH factory in Neckarsulm. The TT RS is the first Audi RS vehicle that didn't have any of its assembly performed in Neckarsulm but was completely assembled in the Audi factory in Győr, Hungary, alongside the base Audi TT.

The TT RS has a new short-shift close-ratio six-speed manual transmission, and like all "RS" models, is only available with four-wheel-drive, with the TT RS using a specially adapted version of the latest generation multi-plate clutch from Haldex Traction. Additions to the quattro system include a constant velocity joint before the cardan propeller shaft, and a compact rear-axle differential – upgraded to cope with the increased torque from the five-cylinder turbo engine.

Like the TTS, the TT RS has a  lower ride height, optional "Audi Magnetic Ride", and rides on standard 18-inch wheels with 245/45 ZR18 tyres (optional 19" or 20" wheels are also available). The front discs are clamped by gloss black painted four-piston calipers, adorned with the RS logo.

It includes a fixed rear spoiler (retractable optional), and has black interior with heated Alcantara/leather sports seats (Silk Nappa, Fine Nappa leather optional). The Recaro "RS bucket" seats, first seen in the Audi B7 RS4 are also available as an option. Also carried over from the B7 RS4 is the "Sport" button, which sharpens the throttle response and deepens the exhaust note, and a three-stage user-selectable Electronic Stability Programme (ESP).

As of 2010 the TT-RS is available with the 7-speed DSG automatic transmission capable of handling the torque delivered by the engine.

The car went on sale in March 2009, with delivery beginning in summer.

In 2010, the TT-RS was confirmed for the US market. The decision was influenced by an internet petition to bring the TT-RS stateside, which succeeded with over 11,000 signatures. The TT-RS arrived in Q3 2011 as a 2012 model.

In 2012, the TT RS plus was launched. As a result of this power increase, Audi claimed that the 0- time had decreased to 4.3 seconds for the manual version, and 4.1 seconds for the S-tronic version.

8J engines
The 8J powertrain options consist of the following engines and drivelines:

Audi was reported to stop offering 3.2-litre V6 (VR6) models in North America from 2010 model year.

8J awards
The second generation TT has been honoured with many awards, including the inaugural Drive Car of the Year, Top Gear Coupé of the Year 2006, Fifth Gear Car of the Year 2006, Autobild Most Beautiful Car, and World Design Car of the Year 2007, as well as being a finalist for World Car of the Year. In addition, an HPA-prepared version of the car was the winner of the SEMA Gran Turismo Award in 2007.The Audi TT has been the What Car? best Coupe of the Year for six consecutive years since 2007.

A 2019 iSeeCars study named the TT as the longest-lasting sports car most likely to exceed 150,000 miles.

TT Mk3 (Type FV/8S, 2014–present)

Like its predecessor, the Audi TT FV/8S was previewed in the form of the Audi Allroad Shooting Brake concept car, shown at the Detroit Motor Show in 2014.

The third generation of the TT was unveiled at the 2014 Geneva Motor Show. The FV/8S generation utilises the Volkswagen Group MQB platform, and is available with a choice of TFSI and TDI engines. The TFSI engines are available with all wheel drive. The TDI comes in front wheel drive configuration, but was then later released with the Audi's quattro all wheel drive.

The interior of the third generation Audi TT is notable for its HVAC design, featuring temperature and airflow controls that are embedded in the air-vents themselves, hence improving ergonomics.

In the US, this generation was available from Model Year 2016 onward.
It was announced in May 2019 that the current generation TT would be the last, and it would be discontinued at the end of the model's lifecycle.

TT RS
Audi's all-wheel drive quattro system is the standard layout and the only transmission option is the 7-speed S tronic automatic transmission.

Special editions

TT RS Heritage Edition
Audi discontinued the TT RS in the United States after the 2022 model year, so they released the TT RS Heritage Edition, a special edition available in five colors and produced in just 50 units. Ten of each color will be made, each color representing a Ur-Quattro rally champion:
  Alpine white with ocean blue leather and diamond silver stitch
  Helios blue metallic diamond silver leather and ocean blue stitch
  Stone gray metallic with crimson red leather and jet gray stitch
  Tizian red metallic with Havanna brown leather and jet gray stitch
  Malachite green metallic with cognac brown leather and black stitch

TT RS Audi Sport Performance Parts Edition
Audi Sport Performance Parts were available from 2018 to 2020 from Audi Dealerships in Europe. These parts were designed to improve dynamic handling for the Audi R8 and the Audi TT models. The retrofit range were  available as add-on features for new car buyers who ordered their cars as a new car customer build. Only 15 fully built example cars were made complete with all the features from the Audi Sport Factory which were distributed around the world for the purpose of International car shows. The 15 Factory built TT RS Audi Sport Performance parts edition cars had their own build type and known as ultra rare around the world. 13 are known to be in Europe (LHD) and 2 in Australia (RHD).

TT RS Iconic Edition
In October 2022, Audi launched the TT RS Coupe Iconic Edition, available only in Europe and produced in just 100 units, of which only 11 are right-hand drive for the UK market.

Motorsport
In auto racing, the Istook's Motorsports team has currently entered a Revo Technik-sponsored Audi TT in the Grand-Am KONI Sports Car Challenge Street Tuner (ST) class.

Under the racing name of RS Werkes, Istook's Motorsports out of Fort Worth, Texas, built and raced the first TT RS brought into the United States in the Grand Am GS class in 2012, 2013 and 2014.

An Audi TT RS was used at the 2009 24 Hours of Le Mans race as the safety car.

The Abt Sportsline team entered a TT into the DTM, and Laurent Aïello took the title in 2002.

Istook's Motorsports has also raced the TT in SCCA's World Challenge race series. Because of their racing involvement, they received the first U.S. Version of the TT-RS in July 2011.

Audi TT Offroad
The Audi TT Offroad Concept was unveiled as an SUV concept version of the Audi TT at the 2014 Auto China. The SUV utilises a 6-speed dual clutch automatic transmission. The hybrid system consists of a  electric motor on the front axle and an  electric motor on the rear axle. In full EV mode, the vehicle uses the rear motor only; Hybrid and Sport modes utilise all three power sources, and all-wheel-drive traction is applied as needed. The distinguishing features of the concept include matrix LED headlights and two new assistance systems: One that scans intersections for potentially dangerous situations, and a second that connects to a municipality's traffic-light system in order to recommend a perfect speed to reach the next light when it is green. The interior is relatively close to the TT's with leather upholstery from Italian fashion brand Poltrona Frau and features a high-tech TFT display in front of the driver populated with the information that would normally be projected onto a central, dash-mounted screen—i.e. navigation, entertainment. The trunk of the vehicle contains a 1:8 scale RC car as a souvenir.

Marketing
Due to Audi's heavy sponsorship of the Marvel Cinematic Universe, the TTS coupe made a cameo in Avengers: Age of Ultron and a convertible TTS was driven by Peter Parker in Spider-Man: Homecoming.

Literature

 Lewandowski, Jürgen, Staretz, David, Völker, Herbert: Das TT Buch. Delius Klasing, Bielefeld 1999, .
 Ruppert, James: Audi TT – The complete Story. The Crowood Press, Marlborough 2003,  (in englisch)
 Maxeiner, Dirk, Lewandowski, Jürgen, Vann, Peter: Excittement – Die neue Generation des Audi TT. Delius Klasing, Bielefeld 2006, .
 Kraus-Weysser, Folker: Audi TT. Steiger, Augsburg 1999,

See also
 Audi S and RS models

References

External links

 Audi.com – international Audi brand portal
 Audi TT lounge – official Audi TT international microsite 
 In Depth: The New (2006) Audi TT Coupé, from AudiWorld.com
 Audi TT 2.7T B5 RS: The unknown prototype, from fourtitude.com

TT
TT
Coupés
Roadsters
Euro NCAP roadster sports cars
Front-wheel-drive sports cars
All-wheel-drive vehicles
Cars powered by VR engines
Cars introduced in 1998
2000s cars
2010s cars
2020s cars
Touring cars
2+2 coupés